Paul A. Dyster (born April 21, 1954) is an American politician who served as the 30th mayor of Niagara Falls, New York from 2008 to 2019. He is a member of the  Democratic Party. 

Having previously served in the Niagara Falls City Council from 2000 to 2003, he was first elected mayor in 2007 and was reelected in 2011 and 2015. He chose not to seek reelection for a fourth term in 2019.

Early life and education
Dyster was born April 21, 1954 in Niagara Falls, New York, the oldest of 10 children, to Dr. Melvin B. Dyster and the late Mary C. Dyster, both of whom were community activists.

Dyster graduated from Bishop Duffy High School in Niagara Falls, New York in 1972. He was valedictorian and Student Council president, and was active on the school's Debate Team and the soccer team. He graduated summa cum laude in 1976 from the University at Buffalo with a B.A., majoring in Political Science and was a member of the Phi Beta Kappa honor society. He graduated from Johns Hopkins University in 1979 with an M.A., majoring in Political Science.  He later obtained a PhD in 1984 in International Relations and Law.

Early political career

Education and public relations
He currently serves on the Board of Directors for the Environmental Leadership Institute at Niagara University in Lewiston, New York.

He also served as Director of the Graduate Program in International Affairs at The Pentagon from September 1989 to August 1994, and assistant professor for the Department of Politics from 1985 to December 1993 at Catholic University of America.

Dyster was a Fellow of International Affairs for the Council on Foreign Relations from 1987 to 1988.

Dyster was a program coordinator and lecturer from September 1980 to May 1981 at Johns Hopkins University.

Business and community experience
Dyster was a columnist for the Home Wine & Beer Trade Association's (HWBTA) newspaper. He is a nationally certified beer judge, and owns Niagara Tradition, a homebrewing supply store in Tonawanda, New York.

He is currently a Board Emeritus for the Buffalo-Niagara Riverkeeper and a spokesman for the Niagara River Environmental Coalition. He is a member of the Oversight Board for Advancing Arts and Culture Buffalo Niagara. He is a founding member and spokesman for the Niagara Waterfront Revitalization Task Force. He sits on the Board of Directors for the Niagara Arts and Cultural Center in the Former Niagara Falls High School, and served as the Board President from 2005 to 2007. He is the Board President for the Niagara Experience Center. Dyster is a member of the advisory committee for Save Our Sites Niagara. He served as the Assistant Scoutmaster for Boy Scouts of America Troop 801 Niagara Falls from 1996 to 2004 and as the Scoutmaster from 2004 to 2005, and as a basketball coach for the Whirlpool Park Little League from 1995 to 1996. Dyster is a group leader for the Life Workshops program at SUNY Buffalo, and is a member of the Niagara River Anglers Association.

Dyster was named Citizen of the Year in 2006 by the Niagara Gazette, the Conservationist of the Year by the Adirondack Mountain Club's Niagara Frontier Chapter in 2006, and was presented with the Good Neighbor Award by the Niagara Falls Memorial Medical Center in 2006.

Mayoralty
Dyster became a city councilman in 2000 under Mayor Irene Elia. He then gave up his council seat after one term to run for mayor and was one of four Democratic candidates, who were Dyster, Niagara County Legislator Sam Granieri, Niagara Falls Water Board employee Glenn Choolokian, and City Councilman Vince Anello. Anello won the primary narrowly and went on to win in a landslide against then-Mayor Irene Elia, who was running for a second term.

In the Democratic Primary in September 2007, Dyster won by a narrow margin over Councilman Lewis Rotella, who was considered the favorite to win the primary. Then-Mayor Anello could not run for reelection due to his violation of state election law by having volunteers who were not in his political party nor registered to vote pass out petitions. Anello went on to be indicted on charges of conspiracy, obstruction of justice and scheme to defraud and was sentenced to federal prison in January 2011 for a separate charge of filing false documents.

On Election Day in 2008, Dyster won the city election by a landslide defeating by more than 70 percent Republican Former City Councilwoman Candra Thomason. 

Under the Dyster Administration, a new courthouse and public safety building was finished and received LEED certification, a new Niagara Falls Amtrak station was constructed, the historic customhouse was restored and a project to demolish the Niagara Scenic Parkway viaduct and create a new Niagara Gorge State Park began. 

In December 2010, Dyster announced that he would seek re-election in 2011. Dyster ran in the primary against former Niagara Falls lawmaker and insurance executive John Accardo (endorsed by the Conservative Party of New York State), community activist Carnell Burch, and former United States Postal Service employee Norton Douglas. In May 2011, the Niagara Falls Democratic Committee endorsed Dyster. In the September 13, 2011 Democratic Primary, he had a resounding victory, garnering 56% of the vote in a four-person field.

In the general election, Dyster defeated Republican challenger Johnny G. Destino and Conservative Party candidate John Accardo, the latter of whom he had defeated in the primary and had not actively campaigned since the primary, winning 52% of the vote against 45% of the vote going to Destino. The remaining 3% went to Accardo. Dyster was the first mayor after a succession of four one-term mayors spanning from 1991 to 2007 to win re-election.

The Dyster Administration

*Appointed by a previous administration

Personal life
He married Rebecca Ann Lucchetti in 1980 and has two sons, Ian and Bert.

References

1954 births
Living people
Mayors of Niagara Falls, New York
New York (state) Democrats
Johns Hopkins University alumni
Catholic University of America School of Arts and Sciences faculty
University at Buffalo alumni